Vice Admiral G. Ashok Kumar PVSM, AVSM, VSM is a retired Flag Officer in the Indian Navy, who is currently appointed as the first National Maritime Security Coordinator. He works within the National Security Council Secretariat under the National Security Advisor Ajit Doval. He served as the 35th Vice Chief of the Naval Staff. He assumed the position on 30 January 2019 from Vice Admiral Ajit Kumar who took over the Western Naval Command. He retired on 31 July 2021 after 39 years of service. He is succeeded by Vice Admiral Satish Namdeo Ghormade.

Early life and education 
He is an alumnus of Sainik School, Amaravathinagar, Tamil Nadu, where he was the house captain of Chera House. He then entered the National Defence Academy, Pune.

Career 
Kumar was commissioned into the Executive Branch of the Navy on 1 July 1982. He is a navigation specialist. He completed his specialisation at Kochi in 1989.

During his career, he has attended the Defence Services Staff College, Wellington, the Higher Command Course at the Army War College, Mhow and the Expeditionary Operations course at Quantico, Virginia.

Kumar has commanded the Kora-class corvette INS Kulish (P63) and the Destroyer INS Ranvir. He has also served as the Executive Officer of INS Brahmaputra. Ashore, he has served as the Head of Training Team (Navy) at the Defence Services Staff College, Wellington, the Defence Advisor at the High Commission of India in Singapore and the Chief Staff Officer (Operations) of the Western Naval Command.

Flag rank
After Kumar was promoted to flag rank as a Rear Admiral, he has held the appointments of Flag Officer Sea Training (FOST), Chief of Staff of the Southern Naval Command and Flag Officer Maharashtra and Gujarat (FOMAG). In the rank of Vice Admiral, he has served as the Commandant of his alma mater - the National Defence Academy and as the Deputy Chief of Naval Staff.

On 30 January 2019, Kumar was appointed the 35th Vice Chief of the Naval Staff. He took over from Vice Admiral Ajit Kumar P who took over as Flag Officer Commanding-in-Chief Western Naval Command.

Vice Admiral G Ashok Kumar took over as the first National Maritime Security Coordinator of India on 16 Feb 2022.

Awards and decorations 
Kumar has been awarded the Param Vishisht Seva Medal, the Ati Vishisht Seva Medal and the Vishisht Seva Medal.

Personal life 
He and his wife Ms. Geetha Ashok have two daughters - Shruti and Swati

References

Sainik School alumni
Living people
Year of birth missing (living people)
Vice Chiefs of Naval Staff (India)
Deputy Chiefs of Naval Staff (India)
Indian Navy admirals
National Defence Academy (India) alumni
Commandants of the National Defence Academy
Flag Officers Sea Training
Recipients of the Param Vishisht Seva Medal
Recipients of the Ati Vishisht Seva Medal
Recipients of the Vishisht Seva Medal
Army War College, Mhow alumni
Defence Services Staff College alumni